Starfire is the sixth studio album by the Norwegian band Jaga Jazzist. It was released 1 June 2015 by Ninja Tune to positive reviews.

Recording 
All songs produced by Lars Horntveth and Jørgen Træen except Big City Music co-produced by Marcus Forsgren.
Arranged by Lars Hornveth and Jaga Jazzist.
Mixed by Jørgen Træen in Duper.
Mastered by Greg Calbi.
Recorded by Lars Horntveth in Pooka Studio (Oslo/Los Angeles), Jørgen Træen and Marcus Forsgren in EngfeltForsgren Studio (Oslo), Even Ormestad in Albatross Recorders (Oslo) and Martin Horntveth in Wallpaper (Oslo).

Personnel 
 Marcus Forsgren - Electric guitar, synthesizers, programming and vocals
 Lars Horntveth - guitars, lap steel guitar, clarinets, saxophones, flute, synthesizers, bass guitar, programming, piano and vocals
 Even Ormestad - bass guitar and bass synthesizer
 Line Horntveth - tuba, flute, glockenspiel, euphonium and vocals
 Erik Johannessen - trombone and vocals
 Martin Horntveth - drums, typatune, tubular bells, percussion and programming
 Øystein Moen - synthesizers, programming, piano and Hammond Organ
 Andreas Mjos - vibraphone, guitar and synthesizers

Track listing 
All tracks written by Lars Hornveth.

References

External links 
 Starfire at Discogs

2015 albums
Jaga Jazzist albums
Ninja Tune albums